The 2015 Tuen Mun District Council election was held on 22 November 2015 to elect all 29 elected members to the 30-member Tuen Mun District Council.

In Lok Tsui, veteran Albert Ho Chun-yan lost his seat to former Law Society of Hong Kong president Junius Ho Kwan-yiu, while radical democrat Civic Passion's Cheng Chung-tai took 391 votes, winning 1,617 votes, 125 fewer than Junius Ho.

Overall election results
Before election:

Change in composition:

References

External links
 Election Results - Overall Results

2015 Hong Kong local elections